Greens Bluff is an unincorporated community in Anderson County, located in the U.S. state of Texas. It is a part of the Palestine, Texas micropolitan area.

Notes

Unincorporated communities in Anderson County, Texas
Unincorporated communities in Texas